This is a list of law enforcement agencies in the U.S. state of Colorado.

According to the US Bureau of Justice Statistics' 2008 Census of State and Local Law Enforcement Agencies, the state had 246 law enforcement agencies employing 12,069 sworn police officers, about 245 for each 100,000 residents.

State agencies 
Colorado Bureau of Investigation
Colorado Department of Corrections
Colorado Department of Natural Resources
Colorado Department of Public Safety
Colorado Division of Youth Services
Colorado State Patrol
Colorado Rangers

County agencies 

Adams County Sheriff's Office
Alamosa County Sheriff's Office
Arapahoe County Sheriff's Office
Archuleta County Sheriff's Office
Baca County Sheriff's Office
Bent County Sheriff's Office
Boulder County Sheriff's Office
Broomfield Police Department
Chaffee County Sheriff's Office
Cheyenne County Sheriff's Office
Clear Creek County Sheriff's Office
Conejos County Sheriff's Office
Costilla County Sheriff's Office
Crowley County Sheriff's Office
Custer County Sheriff's Office
Delta County Sheriff's Office
Denver Sheriff Department
Dolores County Sheriff's Office
Douglas County Sheriff's Office
Eagle County Sheriff's Office
El Paso County Coroner's Office
El Paso County Department of Human Services - Fraud & Investigations Unit
El Paso County District Attorney's Office - 4th Judicial District
El Paso County Security Department
El Paso County Sheriff's Office
Elbert County Sheriff's Office
Fremont County Sheriff's Office
Garfield County Sheriff's Office
Gilpin County Sheriff's Office
Grand County Sheriff's Office
Gunnison County Sheriff's Office
Hinsdale County Sheriff's Office
Huerfano County Sheriff's Office
Humane Society of the Pikes Peak Region - El Paso County
Jackson County Sheriff's Office
Jefferson County Sheriff's Office
Kiowa County Sheriff's Office
Kit Carson County Sheriff's Office
La Plata County Sheriff's Office
Lake County Sheriff's Office
Larimer County Sheriff's Office
Las Animas County Sheriff's Office
Lincoln County Sheriff's Office
Logan County Sheriff's Office
Mesa County Sheriff's Office
Mineral County Sheriff's Office
Moffat County Sheriff's Office
Montezuma County Sheriff's Office
Montrose County Sheriff's Office
Morgan County Sheriff's Office
Otero County Sheriff's Office
Ouray County Sheriff's Office
Park County Sheriff's Office
Phillips County Sheriff's Office
Pitkin County Sheriff's Office
Prowers County Sheriff's Office
Pueblo County Sheriff's Office
Rio Blanco County Sheriff's Office
Rio Grande County Sheriff's Office
Routt County Sheriff's Office
Saguache County Sheriff's Office
San Juan County Sheriff's Office
San Miguel County Sheriff's Office
Sedgwick County Sheriff's Office
Summit County Sheriff's Office
Teller County District Attorney's Office - 4th Judicial District
Teller County Sheriff's Office
Washington County Sheriff's Office
Weld County Sheriff's Office
Yuma County Sheriff's Office

Municipality agencies 
Alamosa Police Department
Arvada Police Department
Aspen Police Department
Ault Police Department
Aurora Police Department
Arvada Police Department
Avon Police Department
Basalt Police Department
Bayfield Marshal's Office
 Black Hawk Police Department
Blanca Police Department
 Boulder Police Department
 Breckenridge Police Department
 Brighton Police Department
 Broomfield Police Department
 Brush Police Department
 Buena Vista Police Department
 Burlington Police Department
 Calhan Police Department 
 Cañon City Police Department
 Castle Rock Police Department
 Cedaredge Police Department
 Center Police Department
 Colorado Springs Police Department
 Columbine Valley Police Department
 Commerce City Police Department
 Cortez Police Department
 Craig Police Department
 Crested Butte Marshal's Office
 Cripple Creek Police Department
 Dacono Police Department
 DeBeque Marshal's Department
 Delta Police Department
 Denver Police Department
 Durango Police Department
Eagle Police Department
 Edgewater Police Department
 Englewood Police Department
 Erie Police Department
Estes Park Police Department
Evans Police Department
Federal Heights Police Department
Fairplay Police Department
Firestone Police Department
Florence Police Department
Fort Collins Police Services
Fort Lupton Police Department
Fort Morgan Police Department
Fountain Police Department
Frederick Police Department
Frisco Police Department
Fruita Police Department
Fowler Police Department
Glendale Police Department
Glenwood Springs Police Department
Golden Police Department
Grand Junction Police Department
Greeley Police Department
Green Mountain Falls Marshal's Office
Greenwood Village Police Department
Gunnison Police Department
Idaho Springs Police Department
Johnstown Police Department
La Junta Police Department
 Lakeside Police Department
Lakewood Police Department
Lamar Police Department
Littleton Police Department
Lochbuie Police Department
Log Lane Village Police Department
Lone Tree Police Department
Longmont Public Safety
Louisville Police Department
Loveland Police Department
 Manitou Springs Police Department
 Manassa Police Department
Mancos Marshal's Office
Meeker Police Department
 Montrose Police Department
 Mountain View Police Department
Monument Police Department
 Mt. Crested Police Department
New Castle Police Department
Northglenn Police Department
Nunn Police Department
Olathe Police Department
Parker Police Department 
Pueblo Police Department 
Ridgway Marshal's Office
Rifle Police Department
Rocky Ford Police Department
Salida Police Department
Sanford Police Department
Severance Police Department
Sheridan Police Department
Silt Police Department
Silverthorne Police Department
Snowmass Village Police Department
South Fork Police Department
Steamboat Springs Police Department
Telluride Marshal's Office
Thornton Police Department
Trinidad Police Department
Vail Police Department
Westminster Police Department
Wheat Ridge Police Department
Wiggins Police Department https://townofwiggins.colorado.gov/departments/police-department
Windsor Police Department
Wray Police Department
Yuma Police Department

College and university agencies 
Adams State College Public Safety Department
Arapahoe Community College Campus Police Department
Auraria Campus Police Department
Colorado School of Mines Police Department
Colorado State University Police Department
Fort Lewis College Police Department
Pikes Peak Community College Police Department
Red Rocks Community College Campus Police Department
University of Colorado Anschutz Medical Campus Police Department
University of Colorado at Colorado Springs Department of Public Safety
University of Colorado Denver Police Department 
University of Colorado Police Department
University of Northern Colorado Police Department

Disbanded/Defunct agencies 
Antonito Police Department 
 Berthoud Police Department (Disbanded in 2014)
 Walsenburg Police Department (Disbanded in 2016)
 Las Animas Police Department

See also
 List of law enforcement agencies
 List of United States state and local law enforcement agencies

Notes

References

Colorado
Law enforcement agencies
Law enforcement agencies of Colorado